Elizabeth Lowell Boland, known by stage name Lowell, is a Canadian singer, songwriter, producer known for her writing collaborations with Madison Beer, Hailee Steinfeld, Bülow, Tate McRae, and more.

Background
Originally from Calgary, Alberta, Boland moved to Toronto, Ontario at age 18 to study music at the University of Toronto.

Musical career
During this time, she began writing some song demos on ukulele, which came to the attention of Canadian music manager Mike Dixon. Dixon forwarded them in turn to producer Martin Terefe, and Boland made her debut in 2012 as a guest vocalist on Apparatjik's 2012 EP If You Can, Solve This Jumble.

She signed to Arts & Crafts, and released the EP I Killed Sara V in February 2014. Her full-length album debut, We Loved Her Dearly, followed in September 2014.

Her song, "Palm Trees" featured as soundtrack in EA Sports game, FIFA 15.

On April 6, 2018, she released her sophomore album Lone Wolf.

She co-wrote all three songs on the debut EP from Bülow, Damaged Vol. 1, which was released November 2017 on Wax Records, including the single "Not A Love Song." Damaged Vol. 1 was praised by critics for its "real and authentic" portrayal of Bülow's voice.

She received two Canadian Screen Award nominations at the 9th Canadian Screen Awards in 2021, for Best Original Score and Best Original Song for "Grey Singing in Auditorium", for her work on the 2020 film Bloodthirsty.

Artist Discography

Studio albums
2014 - We Loved Her Dearly
2018 - Lone Wolf
2022 - hurry

Extended plays
2014 - I Killed Sara V.
2016 - Part 1: PARIS YK
2021 - Bloodthirsty

Singles
2016 - "Ride"
2016 - "High Enough"
2016 - "West Coast Forever"
2020 - "Lemonade"
2020 - "God Is A Fascist"
2021 - "Caroline"
2021 - "Black Boots And Leather Rebellion"
2022 - "Guess I'm Going To Hell"
2022 - "Hamptons City Cowboy"

Songwriting discography

Production Discography

References

Canadian electronic musicians
Musicians from Calgary
Musicians from Toronto
Arts & Crafts Productions artists
Canadian LGBT singers
Canadian LGBT songwriters
Bisexual women
Bisexual singers
Bisexual songwriters
Living people
Canadian women pop singers
21st-century Canadian women singers
1991 births
20th-century Canadian LGBT people
21st-century Canadian LGBT people